The A10 is a national road in Latvia connecting Riga to Ventspils. The road is part of the European route E22.

References

External links

A10